Francine Carrel Saenz Diaz (born January 27, 2004) is a Filipino actress, model  and endorser. She rose to prominence and became a household name as Cassandra "Cassie" Mondragon in the highly successful TV series of ABS-CBN in the Philippines, Kadenang Ginto.

Diaz first started to do commercials and VTRs back in 2012. She first appeared in 2014's Ipaglaban Mo  Episode: "Pagkilala sa Ama"  as she took on the role of Young Ana Mauricio, played by Jennica Garcia with Mylene Dizon followed in 2015’s Pasión de Amor, where she played as the young Sari Elizondo. She has then played guest roles in Be My Lady, The Greatest Love, Ikaw Lang Ang Iibigin and The Generals Daughter. After her big break in 2018's Kadenang Ginto, she was heralded as one of the Teen Drama Queens and since become one of the most promising stars of her generation. Village Pipol hailed her as the 'Princess of Modern Media'.

Personal life
Diaz grew up in Tondo, Manila but they moved out to Cavite, Philippines because of struggles of living.
Francine Diaz is the third out of the six children of Jesus Michael Diaz and Merdick Saenz-Diaz. Her siblings are Chantal, Cameron, Carmela, Courtney, and Eisa. At a very young age, she became the breadwinner of the family.

Career

2014–2018: Early career
Diaz was spotted by her talent manager and tried to invite her into a VTR, where she kicked off in commercials and guest roles. By age 10, Diaz had pushed herself to work and pursue showbiz for her family's future. At first, Francine had a hard time pursuing showbiz but she never backs down. Francine took minor roles on television and portrayed younger roles of characters in several teleseryes in ABS-CBN. She made her acting debut in 2014 when she took on the role of Young Ana Mauricio in Ipaglaban Mo  Episode: "Pagkilala sa Ama"  , played by Jennica Garcia with Mylene Dizon. In 2015 she took the role of Young Sari in the drama series Pasión de Amor (Philippine TV series).

In 2016, she got the young role of Pinang in the noontime drama series, Be My Lady and the role of Anya in the comedy-drama series We Will Survive. The latter was nearly known for portraying the young role of Kim Chiu in the noontime drama Ikaw Lang ang Iibigin. She also got the role of Ginny in the drama series The Blood Sisters in which some has noticed her great acting skills.

2018–2020: Rising popularity

In 2018, Diaz rose to fame when she was tapped to portray the protagonist, Cassie Mondragon, of ABS-CBN's top-rated afternoon television series Kadenang Ginto. Kadenang Ginto proved to be a huge hit in the Philippine Television, it is one of a few daytime television dramas to last for more than a year. Because of her portrayal to the sweet but feisty Cassie Mondragon on the said show, most people known her and even calling her as Cassie in real life. Her role in the show as Cassie became a subject of memes and hilarity. Her character had a love interest named Kristoff Tejada, who was played by Kyle Echarri. Their tandem, with the portmanteau nickname of KyCine became the viewers' favorite. It was awarded as the Best Loveteam of the Year for 2020 in the LionHeart TV Rawr Award.

The success of Kadenang Ginto also led to the founding of the phenomenal group called The Gold Squad, a teenage quartet made up by Francine, Kyle, Andrea and Seth. The phenomenal quartet starred in several films and series. The Gold Squad channel gained 3M subscribers and due to their success, it also led to the formation of a sub-group called the Squad Plus and more rising stars had been added to the group.

In 2020, Diaz and Echarri starred in an iWantTFC movie, Silly Red Shoes. The duo were also cast in Bawal Lumabas: The Series (now on Netflix with an English title Her Rules, Her No's), which was inspired by a viral statement made by the leading actress Kim Chiu regarding the ABS-CBN shutdown.

2021–present: Going Solo and New Projects 

In 2021, she became a main character in a new teleserye, Huwag Kang Mangamba, where she starred along with her fellow Gold Squad members Brillantes, Echarri, and Fedelin. The quartet also became lead cast members in another show—a surreal four-part digital anthology series Click, Like, Share with 4 different episodes. Francine's episode was Cancelled with Renshi de Guzman in Season 1. She also starred in the film Tenement 66 alongside Francis Magundayao and Noel Comia Jr. directed by Rae Red and co-produced by Dreamscape Entertainment. Her first ever suspense thriller film with Magundayao and Comia with Direk Rae Red competed in the 25th Bucheon International Fantastic Film Festival (BIFAN), under the Bucheon Choice category in South Korea. Her performance in the movie Tenement 66 earned her the PinakaPASADONG Katuwang na Aktres at the 34th Gawad Pasado. 

She also reached a new milestone as she made her runway debut at Michael Leyva's Enchanted Fashion Show held at Hilton Manila  in Pasay City, together with Andrea Brillantes. Diaz opens the show with her gorgeous lilac gown with dainty floral accents that made her look like a royalty. Michael Leyva chose Diaz and Brillantes to be his youngest muses for his first fashion show since the pandemic hit the Philippines.  

In late 2021, her on-screen loveteam partner Echarri joined Pinoy Big Brother: Kumunity Season 10 and was criticized by the netizens online for his actions and closeness to a girl fellow housemate despite his loveteam with Diaz. After Echarri's eviction, their loveteam silently dissipated as they both went solo.

In 2022 as she turned 18, she became a cover girl for the Top Magazines in the Philippines :  Metro Magazine :  The Debutante of the Hour is this Season's Breakthrough Leading Lady - where she made her grand debut in a Metro digital cover, modeling fashion designer Michael Leyva's dreamy and sparkly creations, Preview Ph , Candy Mag - as their First Digital Cover Girl of the Year, Stylish Magazine , Mega Magazine  (for the celebration of the Star Magic 30th Anniversary With the New Breed Of Bright, Young Stars: Alexa, Jayda, Belle, Andrea and Charlie) and lastly, Village Pipol Magazine :  "The Rising Princess of Modern Media" and Village Pipol Finale Cover of the Year.

She obtained numerous endorsements as soon as she went solo. She has earned the trust of multiple well-known brands and businesses. She is an endorser and an ambassadress, one of her generation's most sought-after endorsers. 
"Blessings after blessings" ,  she secured another lead role in a limited web series entitled Bola-Bola: Cook. Feed. Love. Repeat, starring alongside BGYO member - Akira Morishita , KD Estrada, and Ashton Salvador that landed on Top 2 Most-watched series on iWant despite having 6 episodes that aired for three weeks, but still managed to remain on top 10 most-watched after the release date of the series. 
After the success of the series, Diaz now has an upcoming TV series with fellow former Gold Squad member Seth Fedelin called Dirty Linen that will premiere on Philippine Television in the year 2023. She also starred in Zack Tabudlo's latest single As You Are (AYA) music video as a lover of the singer, they're actually friends in real life and have known each other for a years now. This marks as their first time to worked with each other professionally. 

Before the end of 2022, her Simply Francine YouTube channel joined the top YouTube creators and was ranked 9th when YouTube revealed the country's top trending videos, top music videos, and creators for 2022.

Discography

Single

Music Videos

Filmography

Film

Television / Digital

Awards and nominations

References

External links

Living people
Star Magic
Star Magic personalities
ABS-CBN personalities
Filipino child actresses
Filipino television actresses
Filipino female models
People from Tondo, Manila
Actresses from Manila
Actresses from Cavite
2004 births